Sun Valley High School is a public charter high school in Mesa, Arizona. It is operated by The Leona Group. In the 2009-11 conference and region alignment from the Arizona Interscholastic Association, its 813 students at the time made it the largest of the associate members (which included several other Leona schools).

References

Public high schools in Arizona
The Leona Group
Educational institutions established in 1996
High schools in Mesa, Arizona
Charter schools in Arizona
1996 establishments in Arizona